Orbital-2, also known as Orb-2, was the third flight of the Orbital Sciences' uncrewed resupply spacecraft Cygnus, its third flight to the International Space Station, and the fourth launch of the company's Antares launch vehicle. The mission launched from the Mid-Atlantic Regional Spaceport (MARS) on 13 July 2014 at 16:52:14 UTC.

Spacecraft 

This was the second of eight scheduled flights by Orbital Sciences under the Commercial Resupply Services (CRS-1) contract with NASA. It was the last planned usage of the enhanced Castor 30B second stage for this CRS Orb-x series.

In an Orbital Sciences tradition, the Cygnus spacecraft was named the S.S. Janice Voss after Janice E. Voss, a NASA astronaut and Orbital employee who died on 6 February 2012.

Launch and early operations 
The mission was originally scheduled to launch on 1 May 2014 but the launch was delayed to 6 May 2014, then to 17 June 2014, then to 1 July 2014, again to 10 July 2014, again to 11 July 2014 due to test stand failure of an AJ-26 engine, to 12 July 2014 due to weather, and finally to 13 July 2014, again due to weather. Orb-2 launched on 13 July 2014 at 16:52:14 UTC with berthing to the ISS following 3 days later on 16 July 2014.

Mission highlights 
 Flight Day 1 (launch): after a 10-minute flight sequence, Antares launched Cygnus into orbit on the same plane as the International Space Station, but significantly below it. Cygnus then deployed its solar arrays after separation from Antares. After a series of checks, ground controllers commanded Cygnus to begin increasing its altitude.
 Flight Days 2 and 3: Cygnus continued to increase its altitude to match that of the space station.
Astronauts aboard the station then commanded Cygnus to a "free drift" mode, where they captured it with the station's robotic arm attached to the station's nadir node.
 Flight Day 5 to Day 36: ISS Astronauts opened Cygnus' hatch, unloaded the payload and filled it with cargo for disposal.
 Flight Day 36 through Day 41 Cygnus was detached from the station and maneuvered a safe distance away. Engineering tests were conducted for 2 days before a series of engine burns were conducted to slow the spacecraft for reentry over the South Pacific Ocean, where it and the cargo inside were destroyed.

Manifest 
Total weight of cargo: 

 Crew supplies: 
 Crew care packages
 Crew provisions
 Food
 Hardware: 
 Crew health care system hardware
 Environment control and life-support equipment
 Electrical power system hardware
 Extravehicular robotics equipment
 Flight crew equipment
 PL facility
 Structural and mechanical equipment
 Internal thermal control system hardware
 Science and research: 
 CubeSats and deployers
 Japan Aerospace Exploration Agency dynamic surf hardware
 Human research program resupply
 Computer supplies: 
 Command and data handling
 Photo and TV equipment
 Spacewalk tools:

Images

See also 
 Uncrewed spaceflights to the International Space Station

References 

Cygnus (spacecraft)
Spacecraft launched by Antares rockets
Spacecraft launched in 2014
Spacecraft which reentered in 2014
Supply vehicles for the International Space Station